Silas Totten (March 26, 1804 – October 7, 1873)was an American academic and college president. 
He served as the third President of Trinity College from 1837 to 1848. He then served as Professor of Moral and Intellectual Philosophy at the College of William and Mary in Virginia from 1849 to 1859. He was the second President of the University of Iowa, serving from 1859 to 1862.

External links
Finding aid for the Silas Totten Papers at the University of Iowa Libraries.
Finding aid for the Silas Totten Papers at the College of William and Mary Swem Library.

Presidents of the University of Iowa
1804 births
1873 deaths

College of William & Mary faculty